Zeillern is a town in the district of Amstetten in Lower Austria in Austria.

Geography
Zeillern lies in the heart of the Mostviertels in Lower Austria. About 15.41 percent of the municipality is forested.

References

Cities and towns in Amstetten District